The Alliance of Political Parties (ALLIANCE) was a coalition of two Liberian political parties, the Liberian Action Party (LAP) and Liberia Unification Party (LUP), that contested the 19 July 1997 elections.

In the election, the ALLIANCE presidential candidate Cletus Wotorson won 2.57% of the vote. The coalition won 2 of 64 seats in the House of Representatives and none in the Senate. While international observers deemed the polls administratively free and transparent, they noted that it had taken place in an atmosphere of intimidation because most voters believed that former rebel leader and National Patriotic Party (NPP) candidate Charles Taylor would return to war if defeated.

Political party alliances in Liberia